Alphonse "Tommy" Thomas (December 23, 1899 – April 27, 1988) was an American Major League Baseball pitcher with the Chicago White Sox (1926–1932), Washington Senators (1932–1935), Philadelphia Phillies (1935), St. Louis Browns (1936–1937) and Boston Red Sox (1937). He batted and threw right-handed.

Background
Thomas was born in Baltimore, Maryland, and graduated from the Baltimore City College high school.

Career
Thomas played for the Chicago White Sox, Washington Senators, Philadelphia Phillies, St. Louis Browns, and Boston Red Sox.  From 1926 through 1929 with the White Sox, Thomas finished in the top 10 in the American League in earned run average three times and in wins three times.  In 1927 he led the American League with 36 games started and tied for the American League lead with  innings pitched, and in 1929 he led the league with 24 complete games.  In 1926 he held opposing hitters to a .244 batting average, leading all American League pitchers.  In 1928, he finished 15th in the balloting for American League Most Valuable Player.

As a hitter, Thomas was better than average, posting a .195 batting average (141-for-722) with 57 runs, 3 home runs, 71 RBIs and 40 bases on balls. Defensively, he was better than average, recording a .975 fielding percentage which was 19 points higher than the league average at his position.

The Baltimore native was also a pitching star and, later, the manager of the Baltimore Orioles of the International League. Thomas pitched for the Orioles from 1921 to 1925, winning 24 games in 1921 and 32 contests in 1925.  Thomas had held out for a higher salary at the start of the 1925 season, and after the season Oriole owner Jack Dunn sold him to the White Sox for a reported $15,000.  He later returned briefly to Baltimore as a pitcher in 1935, and then as a pitcher-manager during the 1940s.  He won 108 games and lost 56 (.659) as an Oriole pitcher, and counting his time with the Buffalo Bisons from 1918 to 1920 has a career 138–85 (.613) record in the International League.  In ten seasons (1940–1949) as a manager, his Orioles posted a 638–734 record (.475) with three winning campaigns.

Thomas served as a scout for the Boston Red Sox from 1949 to 1973, except for a brief stint as general manager of Boston's American Association affiliate, the Minneapolis Millers.  He died in Dallastown, Pennsylvania, at age 88.

References

External links

1899 births
1988 deaths
Baltimore City College alumni
Baltimore Orioles (IL) managers
Baltimore Orioles (IL) players
Baseball players from Baltimore
Boston Red Sox players
Boston Red Sox scouts
Buffalo Bisons (minor league) players
Chattanooga Lookouts players
Chicago White Sox players
Knoxville Smokies players
Major League Baseball pitchers
Philadelphia Phillies players
St. Louis Browns players
Washington Senators (1901–1960) players